Ian Lloyd (3 February 1938 – 5 February 2009) was a South African cricketer. He played in one first-class match for Border in 1956/57.

See also
 List of Border representative cricketers

References

External links
 

1938 births
2009 deaths
South African cricketers
Border cricketers